WKTO (88.9 FM) is a radio station broadcasting a Contemporary Christian format. Licensed to Edgewater, Florida, United States, the station serves the Daytona Beach area.  The station is owned by Mims Community Radio, Inc.

History
WKTO submitted an application to the FCC in 1989. It received a permit to construct and go on the air in 1997, and began broadcasting in 1998.
In 1989, a Baptist church in Samsula had volunteered the use of some of its land for a tower. However, as time passed, church plans changed and a Christian businessman, Mr. Richard Crunkilton, offered his  ranch for WKTO's 300' tower, until selling the land in 2006.
Responding to a newspaper article, Dr. Bill Sharp invited the station to put the studio and control room in the Christian Life Center, then on Tenth Street, in New Smyrna Beach.

References

External links

Moody Radio affiliate stations
Radio stations established in 1989
1989 establishments in Florida
KTO